Laphystiopsidae is a family of crustaceans belonging to the order Amphipoda.

Genera:
 Laphystiopsis Sars, 1893
 Prolaphystiopsis Schellenberg, 1931
 Prolaphystius Barnard, 1930

References

Amphipoda